Honold is a surname. Notable people with the surname include:
 Abby Honold, American rape victim
 Gottlob Honold (1876–1923), German engineer
 Rochus Honold, German musician, a member of Fuckin Wild